Miami Women's Rugby Club (MWRC) is a Division II rugby union club team in South Florida. The team was founded in 1999 under the name Naples/Coconut Grove Women's Rugby and then in 2008 became Miami Women's Rugby.

Miami Women are 2008 and 2009 Florida Cup Champions and are currently ranked 5th in the nation in Division II. In 2008, the team was ranked 5th and in 2007 the team was ranked 4th. The team travels to tournaments during the winter season and gears up for their fall season with an active 7s season during the warm Florida summer months.

Churchill's in Miami is a sponsor of Miami WRC.

References

External links 
 Miami Women's RFC Official Site
 Facebook Page
 Myspace Page

Rugby union teams in Miami
Women's rugby union teams in the United States
Rugby clubs established in 1999
1999 establishments in Florida
Women's sports in Florida